Star Camp is a German performing arts camp that was created in 2009. The camp kicked off in Büren, Nuremberg and Werbellinsee. During the Easter holidays of 2010, Star Camp headed towards Helmarshausen in Bad Karlshafen, Hesse. The Star Camp takes place every year.

Since 2013 Robin Redelfs is the owner.

Background
Star Camp offers professional coaching in areas such as singing, dancing and interview training. It was initiated by German singing sensation LaFee, who stated it was always her dream to create a camp for young, talented individuals, since she would have enjoyed such a camp greatly while beginning her career and pursuing her musical ambitions. Co-founders include young entrepreneur and former major label recording artist, Matthew Mockridge. To create an equal opportunity for everyone interested in Star Camp LaFee and her team partnered with leading media companies to give out scholarships to very talented contestants. Among others, Scholarships were provided by newspaper magazine Bild and television station VIVA. Star Camp currently costs €399 per camper for 1 week. This includes room, board, classes and souvenirs. The age restriction is 10 to 20 years. The Star Camp experience includes daily coaching sessions with professional artists and other representatives of the entertainment industry. Other camp activities such as swimming, movie-night, camp-fire and sports are also part of Star Camp.

In 2013 Robin Redelfs took over the company. Ever since the camps take place under his direction.

Coaches
 Faiz Mangat - Vocal coach and former member of famous pop group Bro'Sis.
 LaFee - Initiator of the Camp. She also coaches in areas such as styling, interview training, stage presence and image.
 Marc Jentzen - Former member of boy group Part Six and Top 10 contestant of Deutschland sucht den Superstar.
 Selina Shirin Müller - Winner of "Beste Stimme 2006" and actress in German movie "Freche Mädchen".

2009
In its first year, Star Camp was taken out in 3 cities. The camp took place in Büren, Nuremberg and Werbellinsee. A total of 5 scholarships was given out, the final show was filmed by RTL and some major label executives were invited to the show. The ensemble song was "Lean On Me" for all three camps. Marc Jentzen from Deutschland sucht den Superstar was a guest coach for the three camps.

2010: Easter Special
The only camp held in 2010 was during the Easter holidays and was called "Easter Special". All campers, headed by 5 specially selected lead singers and guest stars, recorded the promotional song "For Once and For All", the official Camp-Song for 2010. The ensemble song 2010 was "Fame".

2011
Star Camp has announced to take a break in 2010 and will come back to Germany in the summer of 2011.

2013
In 2013 Robin Redelfs took over the company. Ever since the camps take place under his direction.
The Star Camp 2013 took place in Willingen, Germany.

Discography

Singles

Reception
Feedback was generally positive, with campers calling it the time of their lives and stating the organization should keep the same coaches. Online magazine Media Monitor reconfirmed that the participants are given the chance to feel like real "stars in the making", compared to contestants of the Idol series or Popstars, but questioned if they really know that the camp is not intended to make stars. "It's just about the process and not the result", as stated by Star Camp creator Matthew Mockridge.

References

External links
Star Camp
Official MySpace
 Bild: With BILD and LaFee to "Star Camp"
 Viva: Holidays with the Superstars
 My Pokito: Holidays with the Superstars

Camping in Germany
Popstars